Nagrota Surian is a town in Nagrota Surian Mandal, Kangra District, in the Indian state of Himachal Pradesh. Nagrota Surian is 45.2 km from the district headquarters Dharamshala. It is about 260 km from the state capital Shimla. Block Head office is also available in Nagrota surian.

Nearest towns
Nearby villages include
Teen botu, Suknara, Balora, Katholi, Ludret(4 Km), Barial(5 Km), Bhial(6 Km), Nandpur, Ghera, Sakri, Bilaspur, Guler, Basa, Spail, Galua, Bantungli, Ghar Jarot, Jarpal, Baldoa
Pargod Temple(1.1 km)
Dhewa (2.1 km), Amlela (1.9 km), Khabbal (2 km), Jarot (2.2 km), and Katora (2.3 km). Nearest towns are Nagrota Surian (0 km), Jawali, Lunj, Masrrur Temple (7 km), Dehra Gopipur (28 km) and Kangra.

Places of interest
This town is located near the Pong Lake. The Pong Dam Reservoir is very much approachable from Nagrota Surian, which is the main attraction due to migratory birds during various seasons. This reservoir comes under the Ramsar Wetland sites and rancer a small island between pong dam, approachable by boat. It is the home of some local wild animals and has a pathway circling full island and offers great view of the dam.

Transportation to Nagarota Surian
 Nearest airport is Kangra Airport in Gaggal, 36 km away.
 By bus from Nurpur 60 km, from Dehra 28 km
 From Kangra 44 km, from Dharmshala 45 km, and 68 km from Palampur
 Nearest railway station: Nagrota Surian 0 km, i.e., on narrow gauge b/w Pathankot to Jogindernagar
 HRTC Buses from
1. Delhi(6:00 PM from ISBT Kashmiri Gate) 

2. Chandigarh(2:15 PM, 10:00 PM, 1:00 AM from ISBT-43)

3. Shimla(8:00 AM from New Bus Stand Shimla)

4. Pathankot, Dharamshala, Kangra, Dehra etc.
 HRTC Buses from Nagrota Surian on Main Routes:
1. Shimla(6:00 AM)

2. Chandigarh(6:00 AM)

3. Delhi/Faridabad(2:00 PM)

Connectivity to the other regions
1. Jalandhar Route: Sakri-Bilaspur-Guler-Haripur-Dehra-Chintpurni-Mehatpur-Hoshiarpur-Aadampur-Rama Mandi-Jalandhar.           

Or           

Katholi-Ludret-Barial-Nandpur-Jallarian-Guler-Haripur-Dehra-Chintpurni-Mehatpur-Hoshiarpur-Aadampur-Rama Mandi-Jalandhar.             

Or             

Bassa-Ghar Jarot-Harsar-Jawali-Raja Ka Talaab-Jasur-Kandwal-Pathankot-Damtal-Mukerian-Dasuya-Jalandhar           

Or

Bassa-Ghar Jarot-Harsar-Jawali-Fatehpur-Pong Dam-Talwara-Dasuya-Jalandhar.

2. Ludhiana: Sakri-Bilaspur-Guler-Haripur-Dehra-Chintpurni-Mehatpur-Hoshiarpur-Aadampur-Rama Mandi-Phagwara-Ludhiana.

Or

Katholi-Ludret-Barial-Nandpur-Jallarian-Guler-Haripur-Dehra-Chintpurni-Mehatpur-Hoshiarpur-Aadampur-Rama Mandi-Phagwara-Ludhiana.

Or

Ghar Jarot-Harsar-Jawali-Raja 
Ka Talaab-Jasur-Kandwal-Pathankot-Damtal-Mukerian-Dasuya-Jalandhar-Phagwara-Ludhiana.

3. Chandigarh:Sakri-Bilaspur-Guler-Haripur-Dehra-Chintpurni-Mehatpur-Amb-Una-Nangal-Kiratpur-Anandpur Sahib-Bharatgarh-Ropar-Kharar-Mohali-Chandigarh.

Or

Katholi-Ludret-Barial-Nandpur-Jallarian-Guler-Haripur-Dehra-Chintpurni-Mehatpur-Amb-Una-Nangal-Kiratpur-Anandpur Sahib-Bharatgarh-Ropar-Kharar-Mohali-Chandigarh.

Or

Bassa-Ghar Jarot-Harsar-Jawali-Fatehpur-Pong Dam-Talwara-Amb-Una-Nangal-Kiratpur-Anandpur Sahib-Bharatgarh-Ropar-Kharar-Mohali-Chandigarh.

Or

Ghar Jarot-Harsar-Jawali-Raja 
Ka Talaab-Jasur-Kandwal-Pathankot-Damtal-Mukerian-Dasuya-Jalandhar-Phagwara-Nawashehar-Ropar-Kharar-Mohali-Chandigarh.

Facilities Available
 Delhivery Courier Services
 India Post
 Xpress Bees Courier Services
 Indian Oil Petrol Pump
 Bharat Petroleum Petrol Pump
 Maruti Suzuki Sale and Service Agency
 Honda two-wheeler Sale and Service agency
 Dr.Lalpath Labs

Banking Facilities
 State Bank of India
 Punjab National Bank
 The Kangra Co-operative Bank
 UCO Bank
 HDFC Bank

Schools
Adarsh Bharti Public School
D.A.V Public School
Government senior secondary school nagrota surian
Galaxy Public School(Affiliated to CBSE)
Shivalik Public School
S.V.M Public School
Saint Rudraksh School
Govt. Primary School(English Medium)

References

 https://www.tribuneindia.com/news/himachal/cm-announces-upgrade-of-nagrota-surian-to-tehsil-225235

Cities and towns in Kangra district